The  Utah Blaze season was the seventh season for the franchise in the Arena Football League. The team was coached by Ron James and played their home games at EnergySolutions Arena. The Blaze missed the playoffs by finishing with a 7–11 record.

Final roster

Standings

Regular season schedule
The Blaze began the season by visiting the Pittsburgh Power on March 23. Their first home game was against the Arizona Rattlers on March 29. They closed the regular season at home against the Cleveland Gladiators on July 27.

References

Utah Blaze
Utah Blaze seasons
Utah Blaze